2513 Baetslé, provisional designation , is a stony Flora asteroid from the inner regions of the asteroid belt, approximately 16 kilometers in diameter.

It was discovered on 19 September 1950, by Belgian astronomer Sylvain Arend at the Royal Observatory in Uccle, Belgium. It was later named after astronomer Paul-Louis Baetslé.

Orbit and classification 

Baetslé is a member of the Flora family, one of the largest groups of rather bright and stony asteroids, and orbits the Sun in the inner main-belt at a distance of 1.9–2.7 AU once every 3 years and 6 months (1,262 days). Its orbit has an eccentricity of 0.18 and an inclination of 3° with respect to the ecliptic. Its orbit is almost coplanar.

Physical characteristics 

Baetslé takes 6.08 hours for a full a rotation around its axis. Two observations by the Infrared Astronomical Satellite, IRAS, showed an absolute magnitude of 13.40 and a low geometric albedo of 0.03. While the size, rotational period and orbital data are commonly found among main-belt asteroids, the albedo was exceptionally low and suggested that the body's composition could be mostly carbonaceous.

However, subsequent observations by the Wide-field Infrared Survey Explorer's NEOWISE mission gave a higher albedo of 0.22 and 0.30 and the Collaborative Asteroid Lightcurve Link derives a value of 0.33, assuming the body to be of a stony rather than of a carbonaceous composition. This also concurs with the fact that Baetslé is a member of the Flora family of rather bright and stony asteroids.

Naming 

This minor planet was named in memory of Belgian astronomer Paul-Louis Baetslé (1909–1983), professor at the Brussels Royal Military School and a friend of Sylvain Arend. The official naming citation was published on 20 December 1983.

Notes

References

External links 
 Asteroid Lightcurve Database (LCDB), query form (info )
 Dictionary of Minor Planet Names, Google books
 Asteroids and comets rotation curves, CdR – Observatoire de Genève, Raoul Behrend
 Discovery Circumstances: Numbered Minor Planets (1)-(5000)  – Minor Planet Center
 
 

002513
Discoveries by Sylvain Arend
Named minor planets
19500919